The Commander of the Vietnamese People's Navy is responsible for organization, construction, management and the highest commander of the Vietnam People's Navy.

List of commanders

References

Vietnam People's Navy
Vietnamese admirals